Charles A. Miller served as the 14th Secretary of State of Alabama from 1868 to 1870.

References

Year of birth missing
Year of death missing
Alabama Republicans
Secretaries of State of Alabama
Date of birth missing
Date of death missing